Plouescat is a commune in the Finistère department of Brittany in north-western France. It is a seaside resort, complete with a casino and a large camping and caravanning site, adjacent to its extensive beach of fine, powdery sand. The region is largely agricultural, specialising in artichokes, onions, cauliflowers and potatoes.

Geography
Plouescat (Ploueskad), capital of the canton, is part of the district of Morlaix. It is a town in northern Finistère (Penn-ar-Bed), located on the edge of the English Channel, in the country of Léon, on the "Côte des Sables", on the edge of the "Côte des Légendes".

It is separated from Plounévez-Lochrist (Gwinevez) by the Keralle, a small coastal river which rises in Saint-Vougay and flows into the Baie du Kernic, in Pont-Christ en Plouescat; to the east, the town borders Cléder.

The communal finage forms, at least in its western part, a peninsula limited to the north by the English Channel and by Anse du Kernite the south; its western peak lies at Porz Meur.

Population

Inhabitants of Plouescat are called in French Plouescatais.

Breton language
In 2008, 17.02% of primary-school children attended bilingual schools.

Sights

In the centre of the village is Les Halles - a remarkable timber-framed market hall dating from the early 15th Century which has been classified by the French Ministry of Culture as a Monument historique since 1915.

The route of a former railway line provided the foundation for a new road, called Le boulevard de l'Europe, which by-passes Plouescat on its southern side.

International relations
Plouescat is twinned with:
 Braunton, England

See also
Communes of the Finistère department
Hortense Clémentine Tanvet Sculptor of war memorial

References

External links

Official website 

Mayors of Finistère Association 

Communes of Finistère
Seaside resorts in France